This is a list of events related to British television in 1936.

Events

2 November – The first regular high-definition (then defined as at least 200 lines) BBC Television Service, based at Alexandra Palace in London, officially begins broadcasting (after test transmissions began in August). The service alternates on a weekly basis between Baird's 240-line mechanical system and the Marconi-EMI's 405-line all-electronic system. Programmes are broadcast daily, Monday to Saturday from 3pm to 4pm and 9pm to 10pm. Leslie Mitchell is the first announcer to be heard on the new service. 
By this year there are approximately 2,000 televisions worldwide.

Debuts
26 August - Radiolympia (1936)
Unknown (probably November) – Picture Page (1936–1939, 1946–1952)
Unknown - Theatre Parade (1936–1938)

Continuing television shows

1920s
BBC Wimbledon (1927–1939, 1946–2019, 2021–2024)
  The Public Morning (1900–1914) (1918–Present)

Births
 7 January – Ian La Frenais, comedy scriptwriter
 9 February – Clive Swift, actor (died 2019)
 6 March – Jean Boht, actress
 3 April – Tony Garnett, producer (died 2020)
 7 April – Peter Eckersley, producer (died 1981)
 16 April – Derrick Sherwin, producer (died 2018)
 9 May
 Albert Finney, actor (died 2019)
 Glenda Jackson, actress and politician
 17 June – Ken Loach, film director
 30 June – Don Taylor, director (died 2003)
 8 July – Tony Warren, scriptwriter (died 2016)
 9 July – Richard Wilson, Scottish actor
 27 September – Gordon Honeycombe, news presenter (died 2015)
 9 October – Brian Blessed, actor
 10 October – Judith Chalmers, television presenter
 22 November – John Bird, satirical actor (died 2022)
 22 December – James Burke, science populariser

See also
 1936 in British music
 1936 in the United Kingdom
 List of British films of 1936